Sir William Perkins's School is a private day school for girls aged 11 to 18 in Chertsey, Surrey, England. It is situated on 49,000 m2 of greenbelt land on the outskirts of Chertsey. The school was founded in 1725 and the Good Schools Guide described the school as "a friendly school with very good academic standards - ideal for girls who enjoy healthy competition and getting stuck into what is on offer."

History 
The school was founded in 1725 by a wealthy Chertsey merchant, Sir William Perkins. Originally for twenty five boys, the school extended its education to include twenty-five girls in 1736. It moved to purpose-built accommodation on its present twelve-acre site in 1819.

In 1944, the school became a voluntary controlled grammar school for girls maintained by Surrey Education Authority and in 1978 became fully independent as an educational foundation administered by trustees.

When the educational institute became a girls school, there were just two houses: L and P. The girls who were perceived to be more literary from their entrance exam were put into L (Latin) and the girls more inclined towards Mathematics were put into P (Parallel). The additional houses, M and Q, were added in the later formative years of the school that stands today. In 2014, the house names were changed, from single letters to names of famous and intelligent women of Britain: Lonsdale, Montagu, Pankhurst and Quant. Each house bears its own crest and colour: Lonsdale (red), Montagu (yellow), Pankhurst (green) and Quant (blue).

Part of Sir William Perkin’s School Masterplan in 2015 a £4.1 million new development was undertaken, building a new main entrance, music performing arts room, sports hall, fitness studio, dance studio with sprung floors.  Phase II of the development was completed in Spring 2016, in which atrium was with a large pitched roof was connected to the existing dinning hall, and to some brand new drama studios and Sixth Form centre, with own outside terrace. The SWPS Boat Club was opened in 2016 as part of the School's Building Development programme and is situated at Laleham Reach.

Curriculum 
The 2019 ISI inspection report stated 'The quality of the pupils' academic and personal development is excellent.'.  The school has had a tradition of academic excellence and is often at the top of examination result tables in the county. Appearing within The Sunday Times Top 150 Independent Secondary Schools (Dec 2021).

Co-Curricular 
A wide range of co-curricular activities are available to the students, including sport, drama, music, art and many more.

Perkonian's 
The Perkonian’s form the Alumnae and are an active part of the Sir William Perkins’s School life. There are various events arranged for them through out the year, in particular Henley Royal Regatta.

Notable former pupils

Pam Cook - academic, author, Professor Emerita of film
Trisha Goddard - television presenter
Anna Wilson- Jones - television actress
Celina Hinchcliffe - sports journalist
Susie Amy - stage and television actress
Lara McAllen - musician
 Charlotte Harris - Chelsea flower show Gold Medal Winner landscape gardener
 Hatty Taylor - British Olympic Rower

References

External links

Profile on the Independent Schools Council website
ISI Inspection Reports

Private schools in Surrey
Girls' schools in Surrey
Member schools of the Girls' Schools Association
1725 establishments in Great Britain